Thomas Carew (1718–1793) was an Irish politician.

Carew was born in Cork and educated at  Trinity College, Dublin.

Carew represented  Dungarvan from 1761 until 1768.

References

1718 births
Politicians from Dublin (city)
1793 deaths
Irish MPs 1761–1768
Members of the Parliament of Ireland (pre-1801) for County Waterford constituencies
Alumni of Trinity College Dublin